10121 Arzamas, provisional designation , is a dark Themistian asteroid from the outer region of the asteroid belt, approximately 10 kilometers in diameter. The asteroid was discovered on 27 January 1993, by Belgian astronomer Eric Elst at Caussols  in southeastern France. It was later named after the Russian city of Arzamas.

Orbit and classification 

Arzamas is a member of the Themis family, a dynamical family of outer main-belt asteroids with nearly co-planar ecliptical orbits. It orbits the Sun in the outer main-belt at a distance of 2.7–3.7 AU once every 5 years and 9 months (2,095 days). Its orbit has an eccentricity of 0.15 and an inclination of 1° with respect to the ecliptic.

Physical characteristics

Lightcurves 

In February 2010, two rotational lightcurves of Arzamas were obtained from photometric observations at the Palomar Transient Factory in California.

Diameter and albedo 

According to the NEOWISE mission of NASA's space-based Wide-field Infrared Survey Explorer, Arzamas measures 10.8 kilometer in diameter, and its surface has an albedo of 0.08. The Collaborative Asteroid Lightcurve Link also assumes an albedo of 0.08, characterizes it as a C-type asteroid, and calculates a diameter of 10.3 kilometers with an absolute magnitude of 13.4.

Naming 

This minor planet was named after the Russian city of Arzamas, a major transit center on the road from Moscow to the eastern parts of the country. It was founded in 1578 by Ivan the Terrible and is located on the Tyosha River, known for making leather and dyeing fabrics ever since. The official naming citation was published by the Minor Planet Center on 24 November 2007.

References

External links 
 Asteroid Lightcurve Database (LCDB), query form (info )
 Dictionary of Minor Planet Names, Google books
 Asteroids and comets rotation curves, CdR – Observatoire de Genève, Raoul Behrend
 Discovery Circumstances: Numbered Minor Planets (10001)-(15000) – Minor Planet Center
 
 

010121
Discoveries by Eric Walter Elst
Named minor planets
2118
19930127